Brave Combat Federation, also known as Brave CF, is a mixed martial arts (MMA) promotion in Bahrain. It was established on 23 September 2016 by Sheikh Khalid bin Hamad Al Khalifa and is currently the biggest organization in the Middle East, as well as one of the fastest-rising MMA properties in the world.

This list is an up-to-date roster of those fighters currently under contract with the Brave CF brand. Fighters are organized by weight class and within their weight class by their number of fights with the promotion.

Each fight record has four categories: wins, losses, draws, and no-contests. All fight records in this article are displayed in that order, with fights resulting in a no-contest listed in parentheses.

Brave Combat Federation adopted a new weight class for 2019: Super Lightweight (165 lbs), and also increased the weight limit of the Welterweight class to 175 lbs.

Fighters

Heavyweight (265 Ib, 120 kg)

Light Heavyweight (205 Ib, 93 kg)

Middleweight (185 Ib, 83.9 kg)

Super Welterweight (175 Ib, 79.3 kg)

Super Lightweight (165 Ib, 74.8 kg)

Lightweight (155 Ib, 70.3 kg)

Featherweight (145 Ib, 65.7 kg)

Bantamweight (135 Ib, 61.2 kg)

Flyweight (125 Ib, 56.7 kg)

See also

2023 in Brave Combat Federation
List of current UFC fighters
List of current ACA fighters
List of current Bellator fighters
List of current Combate Global fighters
List of current Invicta FC fighters
List of current KSW fighters
List of current ONE fighters
List of current PFL fighters
List of current Rizin FF fighters
List of current Road FC fighters

References

External links

Lists of mixed martial artists
Brave CF fighters